Michal Bobek (born 30 August 1977) is a legal scholar currently serving as a justice at the Czech Supreme Administrative Court. He is a visiting professor at the Institute for European, International and Comparative Law at the University of Vienna Law Faculty and external lecturer at the Charles University Faculty of Law in Prague. He previously served as the Advocate General at the European Court of Justice in 2015–2021.

Works

References

1977 births
Living people
Czech judges of international courts and tribunals
Advocates General of the European Court of Justice
People from Chrudim